Tsepel is a rural locality (a settlement) in Krasnovishersky District, Perm Krai, Russia. The population was 353 as of 2010. There are 8 streets.

Geography 
Tsepel is located 39 km southeast of Krasnovishersk (the district's administrative centre) by road. Bychina is the nearest rural locality.

References 

Rural localities in Krasnovishersky District